The zygomaticofacial foramen is a small aperture. It perforates the malar surface of the convex zygomatic bone near its center, for the passage of the zygomaticofacial nerve and vessels. Below this foramen is a slight elevation, which gives origin to the Zygomaticus.

References

External links
 

Foramina of the skull